Lytle Independent School District is a public school district based in Lytle, Texas (USA).  Located in extreme northwest Atascosa County, a small portion of the district extends into Medina County.

In 2009, the school district was rated "academically acceptable" by the Texas Education Agency.

Schools
In the 2012-2013 school year, the district had students in six schools. 
High schools
Lytle High School (Grades 9-12)
Middle schools
Lytle Junior High School (Grades 6-8)
Elementary schools
Lytle Elementary School (Grades 2-5)
Lytle Primary School (Grades EE-1)
Alternative schools
J.J.A.E.P. (Grades 6-12)
Lytle DAEP (Grades 3-12)

References

External links
 

School districts in Atascosa County, Texas
School districts in Medina County, Texas